The 2015 Louisiana–Lafayette Ragin' Cajuns baseball team represented the University of Louisiana at Lafayette in the 2016 NCAA Division I baseball season. The Ragin' Cajuns played their home games at M. L. Tigue Moore Field and were led by twenty-first year head coach Tony Robichaux

Preseason

Sun Belt Conference Coaches Poll
The Sun Belt Conference Coaches Poll was released on January 28, 2015. Louisiana-Lafayette was picked to finish first in the Sun Belt with 114 votes and 8 first-place votes.

Preseason All-Sun Belt team

David Owen (ARST, JR, Pitcher)
Kevin Hill (USA, SR, Pitcher)
Lucas Humpal (TXST, JR, Pitcher)
Marc Skinner (TROY, SO, Pitcher)
Joey Roach (GSU, JR, Catcher)
Matt Burgess (ARST, JR, 1st Base)
Darien McLemore (UTA, JR, 2nd Base)
Blake Trahan (ULL, JR, Shortstop)
Matt Rose (GSU, JR, 3rd Base)
Aaron Mizell (GASO, SR, Outfield)
Dylan Butler (ULL, SR, Outfield)
Cole Gleason (USA, SR, Outfield)
David Hall (TROY, SR, Designated Hitter)
Cory Geisler (TXST, JR, Utility)

2015 Sun Belt Preseason Player of the Year
Blake Trahan (ULL, JR, Shortstop)

Roster

Coaching staff

Schedule and results

Houston Regional

Baton Rouge Super Regional

References

Louisiana-Lafayette
Louisiana Ragin' Cajuns baseball seasons
Louisiana-Lafayette baseball
2015 NCAA Division I baseball tournament participants
Sun Belt Conference baseball champion seasons